Novo Selo Municipality is a frontier municipality (obshtina) in Vidin Province, Northwestern Bulgaria, located along the right bank of Danube river in the Danubian Plain. It is named after its administrative centre - the village of Novo Selo. The area borders on Romania beyond the Danube to the north.

Settlements 

Novo Selo Municipality includes the following 5 places all of them villages:

Demography 
The following table shows the change of the population during the last four decades.

Age structure
The municipality of Novo Selo has a fastly ageing population. As of December 2018 the share of elderly people (aged 65+) reached 43.4%, up from 41.7% in 2011. The share of children aged up to 14 years old declined from 8.6% tot 8.4% in the same period.

Ethnic composition
According to the 2011 census, among those who answered the optional question on ethnic identification (in total 2970), the ethnic composition of the municipality was the following:

Bulgarians constitute the largest ethnic group in the municipality of Novo Selo. Nearly all Romani people are concentrated in the village of Novo Selo. There is also a significant "Vlach" (Romanian) community, but their numbers are declining rapidly.

Religion
According to the latest Bulgarian census of 2011, the religious composition, among those who answered the optional question on religious identification, was the following:

An overwhelming majority of the population of Novo Selo Municipality identify themselves as Christians. At the 2011 census, 94.0% of respondents identified as Orthodox Christians belonging to the Bulgarian Orthodox Church.

See also
Provinces of Bulgaria
Municipalities of Bulgaria
List of cities and towns in Bulgaria

Notes

References

External links
 Info website 

Municipalities of Vidin Province